Germán Luis Corengia (born 27 April 1981) is an Argentine football manager and former player who last coached Coquimbo Unido.

References
 
 

1981 births
Living people
Association football midfielders
Argentine footballers
Argentine football managers
Curicó Unido managers
Coquimbo Unido managers
Unión San Felipe managers
Expatriate football managers in Chile
Expatriate football managers in Ecuador
Sportspeople from Buenos Aires Province
Rampla Juniors managers